Holy Trinity Church, Kirk Ireton, is a Grade I listed parish church in the Church of England in Kirk Ireton, Derbyshire.

History

The church dates from the 12th century. It comprises a west tower, nave, aisles and clerestory, a south porch and chancel with one bay, chapels and a vestry.

It was restored in 1873 by Evans and Jolley from Nottingham, with the masonry work being carried out by William and Benjamin Doxey.

Parish status
The church is in a joint parish with
All Saints' Church, Alderwasley
St James the Apostle's Church, Bonsall
All Saints' Church, Bradbourne
All Saints’ Church, Ballidon
St James’ Church, Brassington
St Margaret's Church, Carsington
All Saints’ Church, Elton
St James’ Church, Idridgehay
Holy Trinity Church, Middleton-by-Wirksworth
St Mary's Church, Wirksworth

Organ

The pipe organ was built by Henry Willis in 1859. A specification of the organ can be found on the National Pipe Organ Register.

See also
Grade I listed churches in Derbyshire
Grade I listed buildings in Derbyshire
Listed buildings in Kirk Ireton

References

Church of England church buildings in Derbyshire
Grade I listed churches in Derbyshire